Cerastium diffusum, the fourstamen chickweed or sea mouse-ear, is a species of flowering plant in the pink and carnation family Caryophyllaceae. It is an annual herb, to 30 cm.high, occurring in western Europe and northern Africa. Found mainly in coastal areas of Algeria, the Baleares, Belgium, Corsica, Denmark, France, the Faroe Islands, Germany, Great Britain, Ireland, Italy, Libya, Morocco, Netherlands, Norway, Portugal, Sardinia, Sicily, Spain and Sweden.
The flowers have 4, (or seldom 5) petals, 4 or 5 stamens appearing between March and May. The petals are much shorter than the sepals. The leaves are opposite, (sessile) without petioles and the sepals and bracts are all green, without pale margins. The fruit petioles are erect and diffuse at maturity.

There are 2 known Infraspecifics;
 Cerastium diffusum subsp. diffusum
 Cerastium diffusum subsp. gussonei 

It was first published in Synopsis plantarum 1 on page 520 in 1805.

References

diffusum